Jang Kil-ryong is a politician of the Democratic People's Republic of Korea. He was Minister of Chemical Industry in the Cabinet of North Korea and candidate member of the Political Bureau of the Central Committee of the Workers' Party of Korea.

Biography
He served as the director of the Hamhung branch of the National Academy of Sciences and the exterior materials research center of the Hamhung branch of the Academy of Sciences of North Korea. In April 2017, he was appointed to the Minister Chemical Industry in the Cabinet as a successor to Lim Mu-yong (리무영). In May 2016, during the 7th Congress of the Workers' Party of Korea he was elected as a candidate member of the Central Committee of the Workers' Party of Korea.

References

Government ministers of North Korea
Workers' Party of Korea politicians
Year of birth missing (living people)
Living people